The Seoul Convention Bureau, or SCB, exists to promote Seoul to the global leisure travel convention and Meetings, Incentives, Conferences, Exhibitions (MICE) industries.

The SCB works in partnership with the Seoul Metropolitan Government, the Seoul Tourism Organization, the Korea Tourism Organization, the Seoul MICE Alliance as well as other related tourism organizations in Seoul. Employing incentive programs to draw major international gatherings to Seoul, SCB promotes a broad spectrum of activities, known as MICE business.

The SCB assists meeting and event planners with coordination of event and meetings such as site inspections, bidding proposals, transportation, tourism related activities and provides volunteers as well as financial support.

History 
A division of the Seoul Tourism Organization (STO), the SCB was founded on February 4, 2008.
 Establishment and operation of the Seoul MICE Alliance (170 Members)
 Operation of the Seoul Convention Supporters (1,687 Members)
 Founding member of the Future Convention Cities Initiative (FCCI), established in 2011
 Co-host of the Korea MICE Expo (2010-2012)

Stockholders 
Seoul Metropolitan Government (Major Shareholder: 40%) Lotte Tour, Chess Tour, the Shilla, Asiana Airlines Inc., Seeho Entertainment, CJ N City, M Castle Inc., Hana Tour, Sofitel Ambassador Hotel, Korean Air, COEX, C & Hangangland, City Dream Inc., Seoul Tourism Association, Industrial Bank of Korea(IBK) Bank and HS-Ad.

References

External links
 Seoul Convention Bureau's official website

Tourism in South Korea
Non-profit organizations based in South Korea
Tourism agencies
Tourism in Seoul
Organizations based in Seoul